The leafy seadragon (Phycodurus eques) or Glauert's seadragon, is the only member of the genus Phycodurus and is a marine fish in the family Syngnathidae, which includes seadragons, pipefish, and seahorses.

It is found along the southern and western coasts of Australia. The name is derived from the appearance, with long leaf-like protrusions coming from all over the body. These protrusions are not used for propulsion; they serve only as camouflage. The leafy seadragon propels itself by means of a pectoral fin on the ridge of its neck and a dorsal fin on its back closer to the tail end. These small fins are almost completely transparent and difficult to see as they undulate minutely to move the creature sedately through the water, completing the illusion of floating seaweed.

Popularly known as "leafies", it is the marine emblem of the state of South Australia and a focus for local marine conservation.

Taxonomy 
The generic name Phycodurus is derived from the Greek words  phûkos "seaweed" and  derma "skin".

Description 
Much like the seahorse, the leafy seadragon's name is derived from its resemblance to another creature (in this case, the mythical dragon). They feed on plankton and small crustaceans.

The lobes of skin that grow on the leafy seadragon provide camouflage, giving it the appearance of seaweed. It is able to maintain the illusion when swimming, appearing to move through the water like a piece of floating seaweed. It can also change colour to blend in, but this ability depends on the seadragon's diet, age, location, and stress level.

The leafy seadragon is related to the pipefish and belongs to the family Syngnathidae, along with the seahorse. It differs from the seahorse in appearance, form of locomotion, and its inability to coil or grasp things with its tail.
A related species is the weedy seadragon, which is multicoloured and grows weed-like fins, but is smaller than the leafy seadragon. Another unique feature is the small, circular gill openings covering tufted gills, very unlike the crescent-shaped gill openings and ridged gills of most fish species.

Habitat and distribution

Individuals were once thought to have very restricted ranges; but further research has discovered that seadragons actually travel several hundred metres from their habitual locations, returning to the same spot using a strong sense of direction. They are commonly sighted by scuba divers near Adelaide in South Australia, especially at Rapid Bay, Edithburgh, and Victor Harbor.

Ecology

Leafy seadragons usually live a solitary lifestyle. When the time comes, males court the females, they then pair up to breed. From the moment they hatch, leafy seadragons are completely independent. By the age of two, they are typically full grown and ready to breed.

The species feeds by sucking up small crustaceans, such as amphipods and mysid shrimp, plankton, and larval fish through its long, pipe-like snout.

Reproduction

As with seahorses, the male leafy seadragon cares for the eggs. The female produces up to 250 bright pink eggs, then deposits them onto the male's tail with her ovipositor, a long tube. The eggs then attach themselves to a brood patch, which supplies them with oxygen. After 9 weeks, the eggs begin to hatch, depending on water conditions. The eggs turn a ripe purple or orange over this period, after which the male pumps his tail until the young emerge, a process which takes place over 24–48 hours. The male aids the hatching of the eggs by shaking his tail, and rubbing it against seaweed and rocks. Once born, the young seadragon is completely independent, eating small zooplankton until large enough to hunt mysids. Only about 5% of the eggs survive. Each newborn fry begins life with a small, externally-attached yolk-sac. This sac provides them sustenance for their first few days of life. Despite this initial nutrition source, the majority of fry will instinctively learn to hunt and catch prey upon hatching, and will become self-reliant before the sac is gone.

Movement

The leafy seadragon uses the fins along the side of its head to allow it to steer and turn. However, its outer skin is fairly rigid, limiting mobility. Individual leafy seadragons have been observed remaining in one location for extended periods of time (up to 68 hours), but will sometimes move for lengthy periods.

Conservation

Leafy seadragons are subject to many threats, both natural and man-made. They are caught by collectors, and used in alternative medicine. They are vulnerable when first born, and are slow swimmers, reducing their chance of escaping from a predator. Seadragons are sometimes washed ashore after storms.

The species has become endangered through pollution and industrial runoff, as well as collection for the aquarium trade. In response to these dangers, the species has been totally protected in South Australia since 1987, Victoria since at least 1995, and Western Australia since 1991. Additionally, the species' listing in the Australian government's Environment Protection and Biodiversity Conservation Act 1999 means that the welfare of the species has to be considered as a part of any developmental project.

In captivity

Due to being protected by law, obtaining seadragons is often an expensive and difficult process as they must be from captive bred stock, and exporters must prove their broodstock were caught before collecting restrictions went into effect, or that they had a license to collect seadragons. Seadragons have a specific level of protection under federal fisheries legislation as well as in most Australian states where they occur. Seadragons are difficult to maintain in aquaria. Success in keeping them has been largely confined to the public aquarium sector, due to funding and knowledge that would not be available to the average enthusiast. Attempts to breed the leafy seadragon in captivity have so far been unsuccessful.

Australia

Australian aquaria featuring leafy seadragons include the Sydney Aquarium, the Melbourne Aquarium, and the Aquarium of Western Australia.

Canada
Ripley's Aquarium of Canada in Toronto displays both leafy and weedy seadragons.

South East Asia
S.E.A. Aquarium, located in the Marine Life Park of Singapore, displays both leafy and weedy seadragons.

United States

A number of aquaria in the United States have leafy seadragon research programs and/or displays. Among these are the Adventure Aquarium in Camden, New Jersey; Aquarium of the Pacific at Long Beach; the Birch Aquarium at Scripps Institute in San Diego; the Minnesota Zoo; the Monterey Bay Aquarium; the Dallas World Aquarium & the Dallas Children's Aquarium, Dallas; the New England Aquarium, Boston; the Point Defiance Zoo & Aquarium in Tacoma, Washington; the Shedd Aquarium, Chicago; the California Academy of Sciences; the Tennessee Aquarium; Sea World Orlando, Florida; the Pittsburgh Zoo & PPG Aquarium;, Ripley's Aquarium of the Smokies, Gatlinburg, Tennessee;, The Florida Aquarium in Tampa, Florida; the Mote Aquarium in Sarasota, Florida;, and Ripley's Aquarium Broadway at Myrtle Beach, South Carolina.

Cultural references

The leafy seadragon is the official marine emblem of the state of South Australia. It also features in the logos of the following South Australian associations — the Adelaide University Scuba Club Inc. and the Marine Life Society of South Australia Inc.

A biennial Leafy Sea Dragon Festival is held within the boundaries of the District Council of Yankalilla in South Australia. It is a festival of the environment, arts and culture of the Fleurieu Peninsula, with the theme of celebrating the leafy seadragon. The inaugural festival in 2005 attracted over 7,000 participants including 4000 visitors.

In 2006, an animated short film, The Amazing Adventures of Gavin, a Leafy Seadragon, was made on behalf of several South Australian organisations involved in conserving the marine environment, including the Coast Protection Board, the Department of Environment and Heritage and the Marine Discovery Centre. Made through a collaboration of The People's Republic of Animation, Waterline Productions and the SA Film Corporation, the film is an introductory guide to marine conservation and the marine bioregions of South Australia suitable for 8-12 year olds, and copies were distributed on DVD to all primary schools in the State. An educator's resource kit to accompany the film was released in 2008.

The semieducational animated series The Octonauts featured a father and two young leafy sea dragons in Season 2, Episode 18.

See also
 Sea Dragon (disambiguation)
 Weedy seadragon (Common seadragon)
 Ruby seadragon
 Seahorse
 Pipefish

References

Further reading

External links

Australia
 Australian Museum > Leafy Seadragon  Retrieved 8 August 2011.
 Marine Life Society of South Australia > Leafy Seadragon photos Retrieved 8 August 2011.
 Reef Watch > Dragon Search > Photo Library  Retrieved 8 August 2011.
 Seadragon Foundation Inc > Leafy Seadragon Archived from the original webpage. Retrieved 17 February 2014.
 Underwater Australasia > Vanishing Dragon Article on making of a documentary film and DVD. Retrieved 8 August 2011.
 Leafy sea dragon documentary film "The Vanishing Dragon" Scuba diving in South Australia, Retrieved 9 January 2013.

International
 Aquarium of the Pacific > Online Learning Center > Leafy Seadragon Retrieved 8 August 2011.
 Leafy seadragon information
 FishBase > Phycodurus eques  (Günther, 1865), Leafy seadragon Retrieved 17 August 2011.
 Fused Jaw > Keep a Watchful Eye on the Sea Dragons of Southern Australia Retrieved 8 August 2011.
 Jeffrey N. Jeffords, Dive Gallery > Leafy Sea Dragons Photo and multimedia gallery. Retrieved 8 August 2011.
 MarineBio Conservation Society > Phycodurus eques, Leafy Sea Dragons Retrieved 8 August 2011.

Syngnathidae
Marine fish of Southern Australia
Emblems of South Australia
leafy seadragon
Taxa named by Albert Günther
Articles containing video clips